Benjamin Peter Speed (born 27 June 1979) is an Australian musician who composes scores for film, and television. He performed and recorded as Mister Speed and was vocalist and songwriter in the Australian alternative, electronic and hip hop band The New Pollutants.

Music

The New Pollutants and Mister Speed 

Speed formed The New Pollutants in 2001 with Australian musician Tyson Hopprich (DJ Tr!p).

They released a full-length album, Hygene Atoms, a 12" EP Urban Professional Nightmares and a 7" single Sid-Hop. The New Pollutants sound traversed through a number of different genres including lo-fi, trip hop, electro, Commodore 64 music, 1950s and 1960s pop, comedy, alternative hip hop and electronica.

The New Pollutants played at Australian festivals such as the Falls Festival, Big Day Out and were headliners of the 2004 Adelaide Fringe Festival opening concert.

In 2007, Speed released his debut solo album The Dreamer. The album was based on hip hop, indie rock, pop, world music, electronica, reggae and experimental genres. A review in the Sydney Morning Herald described the album by saying "The opening sounds like a scene from The Godfather; it closes with a hybrid of hip-hop rock. In between there are snippets of 1950s French soundtracks, moody trip-hop and multiple samples. The vocals sway between Beck and Buck 65, moving from the philosophy of art to observations of love."

Metropolis Rescore 

In 2005 The New Pollutants, composed and produced Metropolis Rescore, a new soundtrack to the silent film Metropolis and premiered it live at the 2005 Adelaide Film Festival. among other music and film festivals. The soundtrack was described as "an infectious and unique approach ranging from Germanic trip hop and lo-fi electronica to unforgettable classical and breathtaking cinematica."

In 2011, a newly updated score was composed to the 2010 restoration version which has an extra 30 minutes of footage originally thought lost.

Film 

In 2005, Speed began composing film scores and collaborated with The People's Republic of Animation. He received the Best Original Score award at the 2006 St Kilda Film Festival for the animated short Carnivore Reflux,  In 2009, he composed the music for The Cat Piano which was shortlisted for the 2010 Academy Awards and features Nick Cave as narrator. In 2010 he won an APRA/AGSC Award for his work on the series Itty Bitty Ditties.

He has also worked with Closer Productions on their films and television series. in 2013 Speed composed the music for Sundance and Berlin Film Festival Award winning film 52 Tuesdays which was directed by Sophie Hyde. He also composed for their TV series The Hunting, and Aftertaste for which he was nominated for best score at the 2022 AACTA Awards  

Speed composed for the feature documentaries The Snowman in 2010, which won the Australian Documentary Prize and was nominated for an AFI Award. and Embrace, directed by 2023 Australian of the Year Taryn Brumfitt.

In 2023, Speed composed for the film The Portable Door starring Christoph Waltz and Sam Neill.

See also 

 List of Australian composers
 List of people from Adelaide

References

External links 
 Official Site

1979 births
APRA Award winners
Australian film score composers
Australian Film Television and Radio School alumni
Male film score composers
Living people
Musicians from South Australia
People from Adelaide